The 1898–99 Harvard Crimson men's ice hockey season was the second season of play for the program.

Season
Despite scheduling several games, Harvard was only able to play one official match. They also played a few exhibition games against class club teams. This was the only losing season for Harvard until 1923–24.

Roster

Standings

Schedule and Results

|-
!colspan=12 style=";" | Regular Season

References

Harvard Crimson men's ice hockey seasons
Harvard
Harvard
Harvard
Harvard
Harvard